Zœbersdorf (Alsatian: Zäwerschdorf) is a former commune in the Bas-Rhin department in Grand Est in north-eastern France. On 1 January 2018, it was merged into the new commune of Geiswiller-Zœbersdorf.  Most of the houses lie along a single street. Zœbersdorf has no direct connections to routes départementales.  The surrounding land is primarily utilized for agriculture.

Population

See also
 Communes of the Bas-Rhin department

References

Former communes of Bas-Rhin
Populated places disestablished in 2018